The 2022–23 West Asia Super League is the inaugural season of the West Asia Super League (WASL), organised by FIBA Asia. The inaugural season begun on December 19, 2022, and ends in May 2023, with a total of 18 proposed teams.

Format 

The season exists out of 18 teams. Eight teams in the Western Asia region compete in home and away games for the sub-zonal title, while eight teams in the Gulf region do the same. The top three teams from each division advance to the Final round. There they are joined by the champions of the Kazakhstan Basketball Championship and the invited Indian representative. The two teams that advance to the championship game qualify for the 2023 FIBA Asia Champions Cup.

Teams 

Notes:

Group phase

Draw 

The draw was held on 28 October in Beirut, the capital of Lebanon.

West Asia League

Group A

Group B

Final round

Gulf League

Group A

Group B

Final round

Final 8 

In the Final 8, the top three teams from the West Asia and Gulf leagues will be joined by the proposed teams from India and Kazakhstan. The complete stage will be held in one city.

Group A

Group B

Final round

References 

2022–23 in Asian basketball